Saccharum robustum, the robust cane, is a species of plant found in New Guinea.

Ecology
Eumetopina flavipes, the island sugarcane planthopper, a species of planthopper present throughout South East Asia and is a vector for the Ramu stunt disease, a plant disease which affects sugarcane, occurs also on S. robustum.

The pink sugarcane borer (Sesamia grisescens), a moth of the family Noctuidae found in Papua New Guinea, Seram, the Moluccas and New Britain, also feeds on S. robustum.

Scirpophaga excerptalis, the white top borer or the sugarcane top borer, a moth in the family Crambidae, also feeds on S. robustum.

See also
 Domesticated plants and animals of Austronesia

References

 Journal of the Arnold Arboretum. Cambridge, MA 27:234. 1946

External links
 

robustum
Flora of New Guinea